is a former Japanese football player.

Playing career
Tako was born in Shizuoka Prefecture on April 22, 1972. After graduating from Juntendo University, he joined Japan Football League club Fukuoka Blux (later Avispa Fukuoka) in 1995. The club won the champions in 1995 and was promoted to J1 League from 1996. However he could hardly play in the match and retired end of 1996 season.

Club statistics

References

External links

1972 births
Living people
Juntendo University alumni
Association football people from Shizuoka Prefecture
Japanese footballers
J1 League players
Japan Football League (1992–1998) players
Avispa Fukuoka players
Association football forwards